The following is a list of current European League of Football team rosters and staffs for the 2023 season:

2023 ELF rosters

Western Conference

Central Conference

Eastern Conference

2023 ELF staffs

Western Conference

Central Conference

Eastern Conference

References

European League of Football seasons